Pirappan Valasai is a village in Mandapam block in Ramanathapuram District of Tamil Nadu, India.

Geography
It is in the region of Gulf of Mannar in Bay of Bengal. It is located 36 km towards East from District headquarters Ramanathapuram, 9 km from Mandapam. It is 30 km before the temple town of Rameshwaram.

Demographics

Population 
According to the 2011 Census of India the village had a population of 4,406. With the male population of 2,248 and 2,158 females.

Languages   
Tamil language is the local language here. English is taught in schools.

Government and politics  
It is a part of Ramanathapuram (Lok Sabha constituency).

Civic Utility / Amenities / Services  
Pirappan Valasai Pin code is 623516 and postal head office is Irumeni.

Economy 
The main occupation of the community is fishing.

Culture/Cityscape 
Movie Dheepan was shot in this village.

Transport

By Air  
The nearest airport is Madurai Airport.

By Rail  
Pirappanvalasai (PPVL) Railway Station is located in the area. All the trains going to Rameshwaram railway station go through this station. There are around 47 trains passing through this station every week.

By Road  
Ramanathapuram, Rameswaram, Paramakudi and Sivaganga are the nearby Cities to Pirappan Valasai.

References

External links
 Pirappan Valasai

Villages in Ramanathapuram district